Mato Rico is a Brazilian municipality in the state of Paraná.

History 
In 1940, the lands of the region that is now the city of Mato Rico started to be occupied. These were provided by the state government, and acquired by people who migrated to the region looking for low-cost land for subsistence farming.

The settlement grew up and developed from the next year on, when the inhabitants started to settle near the road that served the city. The first school and the first cemetery were built in 1942 and in 1945, respectively. People of Polish, Ukrainian, Italian, Portuguese, Indigenous and African descent also migrated to the city. On January 31, 1991, the city became independent from Pitanga.

Geography 
The municipality has an area of 394,533 m², representing 0.1979% of the state, 0.07% of the region and 0.0046% of all the Brazilian territory. The altitude if of 700 m. According to the Köppen climate classification, the climate is type Cfb. The annual average temperature is 20 °C. The maximum temperature is 22 °C in the summer and the minimum is 18 °C in the winter. Normally, it may rain between 1,700-1,900 mm every year.

Economy 
The city's economy largely relies on agriculture. There are many small properties, most of them measuring 22.4 ha, and most of them using low or medium technology. The main products are: corn, cattle, bean, rice, cotton, soy. Some emerging activities include beekeeping and sericulture.

References 

Municipalities in Paraná
Populated places established in 1993